Woodstock Road is a major road in Oxford, England, running from St Giles' in the south, north towards Woodstock through the leafy suburb of North Oxford. To the east is Banbury Road, which it meets at the junction with St Giles'.

Buildings
At the southern end, just north of Little Clarendon Street, are the Oratory Church of St Aloysius Gonzaga and Somerville College. Opposite Little Clarendon Street is St Giles' Church, built in 1120 and consecrated in 1200. Further north are Green Templeton College, St Anne's College and St Antony's College. Also on Woodstock Road is St Philip and St James Church, now the Oxford Centre for Mission Studies (OCMS) and St. Edward's School which is a prominent feature halfway down. Woodstock Road Baptist Church is an evangelical church on the corner with Beech Croft Road. Jack FM and Jack 2, local radio broadcasters covering Oxfordshire, are based at 270 Woodstock Road, along with the local TV channel SIX TV.

The road is classified A4144.

Notable residents
Former residents include:

 Norman Davis, OBE, FBA (1913–89), Merton Professor of English Language and Literature at the University of Oxford
 Sir Hugh Elliott, OBE (1913–1989), ornithologist
 Lord Redcliffe-Maud, GCB, CBE (1906–1982), civil servant, diplomat, and Master of University College, Oxford, and Lady Redcliffe-Maud (1904–1993), pianist
 Egon Wellesz, CBE (1885–1974), composer and musicologist
 Rowan Atkinson and Richard Curtis, lived together as students
 Dorothy Hodgkin, chemist, awarded a Nobel Prize for advances in protein crystallography, lived at 94 Woodstock Road from 1957 to 1968
 Bill Clinton lived on Leckford Road, just off Woodstock Road, during his time as a student at Oxford.

Adjoining roads in North Oxford
 Banbury Road
 Bainton Road
 Beech Croft Road
 Bevington Road
 Blandford Avenue
 Canterbury Road
 Farndon Road
 Frenchay Road
 Lathbury Road
 Leckford Road
 Little Clarendon Street
 Moreton Road
 Observatory Street
 Plantation Road
 Polstead Road
 Rawlinson Road
 St Bernard's Road
 St Giles' Street, Oxford
 St Margaret's Road
 South Parade
 Staverton Road

See also
 Belsyre Court
 Oxford Oratory
 St Edward's School, Oxford

References

Streets in Oxford
Roads in Oxfordshire
Green Templeton College, Oxford
St Anne's College, Oxford
St Antony's College, Oxford
St Hugh's College, Oxford
Somerville College, Oxford